Pierella astyoche, the Astyoche satyr, is a species of butterfly of the family Nymphalidae. It is found in South America.

Subspecies
Pierella astyoche astyoche (Guyana, Brazil: Pará)
Pierella astyoche bernhardina Bryk, 1953 (Brazil: Amazonas)
Pierella astyoche stollei Ribeiro, 1931 (Brazil: Rondônia)

References

Butterflies described in 1849
Haeterini
Fauna of Brazil
Nymphalidae of South America